St. Adalbert's Church may refer to:

Hungary
Esztergom Basilica, Primatial Basilica of the Blessed Virgin Mary Assumed Into Heaven and St Adalbert

Poland
Gniezno Cathedral, The Cathedral Basilica of the Assumption of the Blessed Virgin Mary and St. Adalbert
Church of St. Adalbert, Kraków
Church of St. Adalbert, Poznań

Russia
St. Adalbert's Church, Königsberg, a former Roman Catholic Church in Kaliningrad, Russia, now used as a laboratory

United States
 St. Adalbert Parish (Enfield, Connecticut)
 St. Adalbert's in Chicago, Illinois
 St. Adalbert Parish, South Bend, Indiana
 St. Adalbert Parish, Hyde Park, Massachusetts
 Basilica of St. Adalbert (Grand Rapids, Michigan) 
 St. Adalbert, a church in the Roman Catholic Archdiocese of Newark, New Jersey
 St. Adalbert's Basilica, Buffalo, New York
 St. Adelbert's Church (Bronx), New York
 St. Adalbert's Church (Staten Island), New York)
 St. Adalbert Roman Catholic Church, Queens, New York
 St. Adalbert Polish Catholic Church, Dayton, Ohio
 Ss. Adalbert and Hedwig, a church in the Roman Catholic Diocese of Toledo, Ohio
 St. Adalbert in Philadelphia, Pennsylvania
 St. Adalbert's Parish (Providence, Rhode Island)
 St. Adalbert's Church (Milwaukee), Wisconsin

See also
 St. Adelbert's Abbey
 Saint Albert (disambiguation)